Matthew Stafford (1852 – 12 June 1950) was an Irish businessman who served for four terms in Seanad Éireann, over a period of ten years. He was nominated by the Taoiseach to the 2nd Seanad in 1937, the 3rd Seanad in 1938, 4th Seanad in 1943, and to the 5th Seanad in 1944. He only spoke twice in his time there. He took part in the abortive 1867 rebellion and as a sniper in the 1916 Easter Rising.

References

1852 births
1950 deaths
Businesspeople from County Dublin
Fianna Fáil senators
Members of the 2nd Seanad
Members of the 3rd Seanad
Members of the 4th Seanad
Members of the 5th Seanad
Politicians from County Dublin
Nominated members of Seanad Éireann